Local elections were held in Las Piñas on May 9, 2016, within the Philippine general election. The voters elected for the elective local posts in the city: the mayor, vice mayor, the one Congressman, and the councilors, six in each of the city's two legislative districts.

Background
Incumbent Mayor Vergel "Nene" Aguilar was on third and final term. His wife, former Mayor Imelda Aguilar ran for his place. Aguilar was challenged by former Councilor Benjamin Gonzales, Antonio Abellar Jr., Gabina Punsalan, Vergilio Lontoc, and Rolly Gundan.

Incumbent Vice Mayor Luis "Louie" Bustamante was on second term. He ran for third and final term, and challenged by Luis "Louie" Casimiro.

Incumbent Representative Mark Villar was on second term. He ran for third and final term, and challenged by incumbent First District Councilor Zardi Abellera and Filipino Alvarado.

Results

For Mayor
Former Mayor Imelda Aguilar succeeded his husband, won with 184,437 votes over his closest rivals former Councilor Benjamin Gonzales and Antonio Abellar Jr. with 6,481 and 5,952 votes respectively.

For Vice Mayor
Incumbent Vice Mayor Luis "Louie" Bustamante won with 156,437 votes. over Luis "Louie" Casimiro with 37,211 votes.

For Representative
Incumbent Representative Mark Villar won with 174,533 votes over his closest rival, incumbent First District Councilor Zardi Abellera with 23,780 votes.

For Councilor

First District

|-bgcolor=black
|colspan=5|

Second District 

|-bgcolor=black
|colspan=5|

Note 
Representative Mark Villar was considered to run for the Senatorial post, but he decided to sought a reelection this election after a series of consultations with his family and the constituents.

References

External links
COMELEC's List of Local Candidates for Verification

2016 Philippine local elections
Elections in Las Piñas
2016 elections in Metro Manila